The Facts of Life Reunion is a 2001 American made-for-television comedy-drama film based on the 1979–1988 NBC sitcom The Facts of Life which reunited original cast members Charlotte Rae, Lisa Whelchel, Mindy Cohn and Kim Fields. Nancy McKeon was unable to participate due to scheduling conflicts with her then-starring role in the television series The Division.

The film originally aired on ABC as a presentation of The Wonderful World of Disney on Sunday, November 18, 2001. It is the third television film based on the series and is preceded by The Facts of Life Goes to Paris (1982) and The Facts of Life Down Under (1987).

Synopsis
Thirteen years after the events of the original series, a widowed Mrs. Garrett is heading back to America on a cruise ship, ready for a whole new life and also looking forward to seeing "her girls" again, all of whom have grown into successful, independent women:

 Blair Warner is a lawyer and also owns a hotel empire (Warner Enterprises) with her husband Tad Warner, managed by Mrs. Garrett's son Raymond; Blair and Tad have no children.
 Dorothy "Tootie" Ramsey, now preferring to be called Dorothy, is a morning talk show host in Los Angeles and the widowed mother of 10-year-old daughter Tisha (fathered by her longtime boyfriend and later deceased husband, Jeff Williams, who was portrayed by Todd Hallowell).
 Natalie Green is a behind-the-scenes television news producer at CNN with an active love life and a frenetic work schedule that takes her all over the world.
 Jo Polniaczek is a police officer who is still married to Rick Bonner and the mother of a 12-year-old daughter Jamie.

Natalie has talked to Mrs. Garrett and all the girls into spending the Thanksgiving holiday together back in Peekskill, New York. When Jo is unable to attend the reunion because of work, her daughter Jamie comes instead in her absence. Natalie has received two different marriage proposals but when her two boyfriends–Robert and Harper–unexpectedly show up at the reunion, trouble soon starts and it's up to the girls to help solve Natalie's predicament. Over the course of the holiday, the girls reveal to one another the personal troubles they face in their adult years and discover that, despite the time that has passed, they need each other's friendship more than ever.

Cast
 Charlotte Rae as Edna Garrett
 Lisa Whelchel as Blair Warner
 Mindy Cohn as Natalie Green
 Kim Fields as Dorothy "Tootie" Ramsey
 Joel Brooks as Raymond Garrett
 Carl Marotte as Rick Bonner
 Mallory Margel as Jamie Bonner
 Kevin Jubinville as Tad Warner
 Alexandra Johnson as Tisha Ramsey
 Jeffrey Ray as Jonathan Monroe
 Barclay Hope as Robert James
 Mark Lutz as Harper Jason
 Joe Dinicol as Sam

Production
The Facts of Life Reunion was filmed from September 10, 2001 to October 8, 2001 in Toronto, Ontario, Canada. All the outdoor scenes in Peekskill and the train station were shot as the World Trade Center went down during the September 11, 2001 attacks in New York City.

Nancy McKeon originally met with the reunion's producers early on and offered to direct the movie if the plot revolved around Jo's death, similar to the film The Big Chill. "It was a joke," McKeon later explained to Biography. "And it kind of took on some other life...I love that character. That show, that character has given me all that has come after. How could I ever not be grateful for something so wonderful in my life? But, I really don't think the world needs yet another remake of some show that was a hit back in the day." During the reunion's filming schedule, McKeon was also busy filming the second season of her Lifetime crime-drama series,  The Division.

The original writers from The Facts of Life were said either not to care, weren't around, or didn't want to be a part of it so the script was written by Max Enscoe and Annie de Young with an assist by Kevin Hench and Heather Juergensen.

In a TV Guide magazine article in March 2001, Mackenzie Astin, who played Andy Moffett on The Facts of Life from 1985–88, was asked about the reunion and he was quoted as saying: "I keep hearing about that too. I hope it's not happening, because nobody's called me! If it does, I hope they do call." Ultimately, Astin did not appear in the movie, neither did series regulars Cloris Leachman, George Clooney or Sherrie Krenn.

Ratings
Nielsen ratings for The Facts of Life Reunion were 11.5 million viewers, 7.1 rating, 11 share and ranked #51 out of about 123 shows. In 2002, it re-aired on the ABC Family Channel on Saturday, September 14, Tuesday, September 17 and Wednesday, September 18.

References

External links
 The Facts of Life Reunion Site
 
 
 The Facts of Life Reunion at Paley Center for Media

2001 television films
2001 films
2001 comedy-drama films
American comedy-drama television films
Thanksgiving in films
Films directed by Charles Herman-Wurmfeld
Films set in Westchester County, New York
Films shot in Toronto
Films based on television series
Television series reunion films
Disney television films
Walt Disney anthology television series episodes
Reunion
Television films based on television series
2000s American films
2000s English-language films
English-language comedy-drama films